is one of the 16 wards of the city of Nagoya in Aichi Prefecture, Japan. As of 1 October 2019, the ward had an estimated population of 107,622 and a population density of 9,592 persons per km². The total area was 11.22 km².

Geography
Mizuho Ward is located near the geographic center of Nagoya city.

Surrounding municipalities
Showa Ward
Atsuta Ward
Tenpaku Ward
Minami Ward

History
Mizuho District was established on February 11, 1944 from the eastern portion of Atsuka-ku.

Education
Nagoya City University
Nagoya Women's University
Aichi Mizuho College

Transportation

Railroads
Meitetsu - Nagoya Main Line
  
Nagoya Municipal Subway - Sakura-dōri Line
  -  -  -
 
Nagoya Municipal Subway - Meijō Line
  -  -

Highways
Route 3 (Nagoya Expressway) 
National Route 1

Local attractions
Nagoya City Museum
Mizuho Kofun Group
Mizuho rugby stadium.

References

Wards of Nagoya